The Patriot is a 2000 American epic historical war film written by Robert Rodat, directed by Roland Emmerich and starring Mel Gibson, Chris Cooper, Heath Ledger and Jason Isaacs. The story takes place mainly in rural Berkeley County in South Carolina and depicts Benjamin Martin (Gibson), an American colonist opposed to going to war with Great Britain who, along with his adult son, (Ledger) gets swept into the Revolutionary War when his home life is disrupted and one of his sons is murdered by a cruel British officer (Isaacs). Rodat has said Martin is a composite character based on four historical men: Andrew Pickens, Francis Marion, Daniel Morgan and Thomas Sumter.

Most of the film's events occur in the Southern theater of the war. Despite receiving generally positive reviews from critics, it was harshly criticized by British critics and historians and stirred controversy in the United Kingdom due to its themes of anti-British sentiment, its fictionalized portrayal of British figures and atrocities, including killing wounded soldiers and prisoners of war, the film's main villain shooting a child in cold blood and an ahistorical scene in which a church filled with colonists is locked and burned which was controversial due to it being similar to the Oradour-sur-Glane massacre, a World War II war crime perpetrated by the Waffen-SS in June 1944. In his review of the film, critic Roger Ebert wrote, "None of it has much to do with the historical reality of the Revolutionary War".

Plot

During the American Revolutionary War in 1776, Captain Benjamin Martin, a veteran of the French and Indian War and a widower with seven children, is called to Charleston to vote in the South Carolina General Assembly on a levy supporting the Continental Army. Fearing war against Great Britain and not wanting to force others to fight when he will not, Benjamin abstains; the vote is nonetheless passed, and, against his father's wishes, Benjamin's eldest son Gabriel joins the Army.
 
Two years later, Charleston falls to the British and a wounded Gabriel returns home carrying dispatches. The Martins care for both British and American wounded from a nearby battle before British Dragoons led by Colonel William Tavington arrive, arrest Gabriel with the intention of hanging him as a spy, and seize Benjamin's African American workers for their own use. When Benjamin's son Thomas tries to free Gabriel, he is shot and killed by Tavington, who then orders the Martins' house burned and all wounded Americans executed. After the British leave, Benjamin, accompanied by his two younger sons, set up a row of muskets and ambush the British convoy transporting Gabriel. Benjamin skillfully, yet brutally, slaughters several British troops with his tomahawk. A British survivor tells Tavington of the attack, earning Benjamin the moniker of the "Ghost".

Gabriel decides to rejoin the Continentals and Benjamin soon follows, leaving the younger children in the care of Benjamin's sister-in-law, Charlotte. While traveling, they witness American soldiers and militiamen under General Horatio Gates engaging the British Army. Benjamin points out the foolishness of undisciplined and untested men fighting well-trained British regulars on open ground; sure enough, the Continentals are decisively routed. Benjamin meets his former commanding officer, Col. Harry Burwell, who appoints him as colonel of a newly raised militia unit due to his combat experience and also places Gabriel under his father's command. Benjamin is tasked with weakening Lord Cornwallis's regiments through a sustained campaign of guerrilla warfare. Benjamin is also provided the service of French Major Jean Villeneuve, who helps train the militia and promises more French aid.

Gabriel asks why Villeneuve and others often mention an incident at Fort Wilderness. Benjamin, having been hesitant to answer the question up to now, finally tells his son: while fighting in the British Army, he and several other soldiers discovered French soldiers committing an atrocity against British colonists. The enraged men caught up with the retreating French at Fort Wilderness and killed all but two of them. The survivors were forced to gather the heads of their comrades and present them to the Cherokee, convincing the tribe to betray the French and side with the British. Benjamin reveals that he has been haunted by guilt ever since.

Benjamin's militia carries out brutal ambushes of British patrols and supply caravans, even capturing some of Cornwallis' personal effects and his two Great Danes, and burn the bridges and ferries needed by Cornwallis. The general angrily blames Tavington for his setbacks, but when Benjamin uses what Cornwallis perceives as a dishonorable ploy to free some of the captured men, he reluctantly permits Tavington to do whatever he pleases if it puts a stop to the attacks. With the reluctant aid of Wilkins, a local Loyalist, Tavington has the homes of several militiamen burned and their families executed. Benjamin's family flees Charlotte's plantation as it is burned to live in a Gullah settlement with formerly enslaved residents. There, Gabriel marries his betrothed, Anne.

Tavington's brigade raids a town that has been secretly providing the militia with food. He has all the residents, including Anne and her parents, assembled in the church and demands the location of their camp. After their location is given, he has the doors barricaded, and orders the church to be burned, killing everyone inside. When they discover the tragedy, Gabriel and several other soldiers attack Tavington's encampment; Tavington is wounded but manages to kill Gabriel before retreating. Benjamin mourns and contemplates desertion before being reminded of his son's dedication to the cause by finding an American flag he repaired. Martin's militia, along with a larger Continental Army regiment, confronts Cornwallis' troops in a decisive battle at Cowpens. Benjamin rallies his side, and he and Tavington meet in personal combat. Tavington disarms and wounds Benjamin with his saber, before preparing to deliver the coup de grâce. At the last second, Benjamin dodges the attack and impales Tavington twice in the abdomen and throat respectively, killing him. The battle is a Continental victory, and Cornwallis sounds the retreat.

After many retreats, Cornwallis is besieged at Yorktown, Virginia where he surrenders to the surrounding Continental Army and the long-awaited French naval force. After the conflict ends, Benjamin returns to his family, with Charlotte carrying their new baby, and discovers members of his former militia unit rebuilding his homestead on their old town road.

Cast
 Mel Gibson as Captain/Colonel Benjamin Martin A veteran of the French and Indian War, the hero of the fictional Fort Wilderness, and widowed father of seven children, He is based on a composite of historical characters which include Thomas Sumter, Daniel Morgan, Nathanael Greene, Andrew Pickens, and Francis Marion.
 Joely Richardson as Charlotte Selton Benjamin's sister-in-law and later wife. She is the owner of a plantation that is burned down by the British. She looks after Benjamin's children while he is fighting; eventually they have a child together.
 Heath Ledger as Corporal Gabriel Edward Martin Benjamin's eldest child, and the husband of Anne Howard. He decides to join up with the Continental Army against his father's wishes.
 Lisa Brenner as Anne Patricia Howard Gabriel's childhood friend and love interest.
 Gregory Smith as Thomas Martin Benjamin's second son, he, like Gabriel, is anxious to fight in the war, but Benjamin says he has to wait because of his age. He is shot and killed by Tavington when he protests against Gabriel's arrest.
 Trevor Morgan as Nathan Martin Third son, he and Samuel help around the plantation.
 Bryan Chafin as Samuel Martin Fourth son, he is usually seen helping Nathan around the plantation. 
 Mika Boorem as Margaret "Meg" Martin Benjamin's older daughter, she is often seen taking care of her younger siblings.
 Logan Lerman as William Martin, Benjamin's fifth and youngest son.
 Skye McCole Bartusiak as Susan Martin The youngest of Benjamin's seven children, initially she will not speak, which may be a post-traumatic reaction to the death of their mother Elizabeth. 
 Jason Isaacs as Colonel William Tavington Colonel of the Green Dragoons, he’s portrayed as a brutal and psychopathic commander. The character is based on Banastre Tarleton.
 Chris Cooper as Colonel/Brigadier General Harry Burwell One of Benjamin's commanding officers in the French and Indian War and a colonel of the Continental Army. He fought in the 1775 Battle of Bunker Hill. He is based on Lieutenant Colonel Henry "Light Horse Harry" Lee.
 Tchéky Karyo as Major Jean Villeneuve A French officer who trains Martin's militia, he holds a grudge against Martin for his part in the French and Indian War, but they become close friends by the war's end. He serves as Martin's second-in-command.
 René Auberjonois as Reverend Oliver A minister of Pembroke who volunteers to fight with the militia. 
 Tom Wilkinson as Lieutenant General Charles Cornwallis, 2nd Earl Cornwallis  A general of the British army. 
 Donal Logue as Dan Scott One of Benjamin's men. He is a racist and bullies the former slave Occam, but grows to befriend him.
 Peter Woodward as Brigadier General Charles O'Hara  Cornwallis' second-in-command. 
 Leon Rippy as John Billings One of Benjamin's neighbors and oldest friends who joins the militia. He is one of the 18 captured men taken to Fort Carolina and later released by Benjamin.
Adam Baldwin as Captain James Wilkins An officer in the Loyalist Colonial militia recruited into the Green Dragoons by Captain Bordon. 
 Jamieson K. Price as Captain Bordon Tavington's second-in-command of the Green Dragoons. 
 Jay Arlen Jones as Occam A black slave who is sent to fight in his master's place. 
 Joey D. Vieira as Peter Howard Anne Howard's father.
 Zach Hanner as British field officer.
 Terry Layman as General George Washington.
 Andy Stahl as General Nathanael Greene.
 Grahame Wood as a British Lieutenant.

Production

Script
Screenwriter Robert Rodat wrote seventeen drafts of the script before there was an acceptable one. In an early version, Anne is pregnant with Gabriel's child when she dies in the burning church. Rodat wrote the script with Gibson in mind for Benjamin Martin, and gave the Martin character six children to signal this preference to studio executives. After the birth of Gibson's seventh child, the script was changed so that Martin had seven children. Like the character William Wallace, which Gibson portrayed in Braveheart five years earlier, Martin is a man seeking to live his life in peace until revenge drives him to lead a cause against a national enemy after the life of an innocent family member is taken.

Casting
Harrison Ford turned down the lead role of Benjamin Martin because he considered the film "too violent," and that, "it boiled the American Revolution down to one guy wanting revenge." Gibson was paid a record salary of $25 million. Joshua Jackson, Elijah Wood, Jake Gyllenhaal, and Brad Renfro were considered to play Gabriel Martin. The producers and director narrowed their choices for the role of Gabriel to Ryan Phillippe and Heath Ledger, with the latter chosen because Emmerich thought he possessed "exuberant youth".

Filming
The film's German director Emmerich said "these were characters I could relate to, and they were engaged in a conflict that had a significant outcome—the creation of the first modern democratic government."

The film was shot entirely on location in South Carolina, including Charleston, Rock Hill—for many of the battle scenes, and Lowrys—for the farm of Benjamin Martin, as well as nearby Fort Lawn. It was filmed in mid-1999. Other scenes were filmed at Mansfield Plantation, an antebellum rice plantation in Georgetown, Middleton Place in Charleston, South Carolina, at the Cistern Yard on the campus of College of Charleston, and Hightower Hall and Homestead House at Brattonsville, South Carolina, along with the grounds of the Brattonsville Plantation in McConnells, South Carolina. Producer Mark Gordon said the production team "tried their best to be as authentic as possible" because "the backdrop was serious history," giving attention to details in period dress. Producer Dean Devlin and the film's costume designers examined actual Revolutionary War uniforms at the Smithsonian Institution prior to shooting.

Musical score

The musical score for The Patriot was composed and conducted by John Williams and was nominated for an Academy Award. David Arnold, who composed the scores to Emmerich's Stargate, Independence Day, and Godzilla, created a demo for The Patriot that was ultimately rejected. As a result, Arnold never returned to compose for any of Emmerich's subsequent films and was replaced by Harald Kloser and Thomas Wander.

Reception

Critical response
On Rotten Tomatoes, the film holds an approval rating of 62% based on 137 reviews, with an average rating of 6.10/10. The site's critics consensus reads: "The Patriot can be entertaining to watch, but it relies too much on formula and melodrama." On Metacritic, the film has a weighted average score of 63 out of 100, based on 35 critics, indicating "generally favorable reviews". Audiences surveyed by CinemaScore gave the film an average grade "A" on an A+ to F scale.

The New York Times critic Elvis Mitchell gave the film a generally negative review, although he praised its casting and called Mel Gibson "an astonishing actor", particularly for his "on-screen comfort and expansiveness". He said the film is a "gruesome hybrid, a mix of sentimentality and brutality". Jamie Malanowski, also writing in The New York Times, said The Patriot "will prove to many a satisfying way to spend a summer evening. It's got big battles and wrenching hand-to-hand combat, a courageous but conflicted hero and a dastardly and totally guilt-free villain, thrills, tenderness, sorrow, rage and a little bit of kissing".

False reviews controversy
A highly positive review was purportedly written by a critic named David Manning, who was credited to The Ridgefield Press, a small Connecticut weekly news publication. During an investigation into Manning's quotes, Newsweek reporter John Horn discovered that the newspaper had never heard of him. The story emerged at around the same time as an announcement that Sony had used employees posing as moviegoers in television commercials to praise the film. These occurrences, in tandem, raised questions and controversy about ethics in film promotion practices.

On the June 10, 2001, episode of Le Show, host Harry Shearer conducted an in-studio interview with Manning, whose "review" of the film was positive. The voice of Manning was provided by a computer voice synthesizer.

On August 3, 2005, Sony made an out-of-court settlement and agreed to refund $5 each to dissatisfied customers who saw this and four other films in American theaters, as a result of Manning's reviews.

Box office
The Patriot opened in 3,061 venues at #2 with $22,413,710 domestically in its opening weekend, falling slightly short of expectations (predictions had the film opening #1 with roughly $25 million ahead). The film opened behind Warner Bros.'s The Perfect Storm, which opened at #1 with $41,325,042. The film closed on October 16, 2000 with $113,330,342 domestically, which barely recouped its budget of $110 million. It was successful overseas grossing $101,964,000 with a grand total of $215,294,342.

Accolades
The Patriot was nominated for three Academy Awards: Best Cinematography, Best Original Score, and Best Sound (Kevin O'Connell, Greg P. Russell and Lee Orloff). It also received several guild awards, including the American Society of Cinematographers award to Caleb Deschanel for Outstanding Achievement in Cinematography and the Hollywood Makeup Artist and Hair Stylist Guild Award for Best Period Makeup and Best Period Hair Styling.

Historical authenticity
During development, Emmerich and his team consulted with experts at the Smithsonian Institution on set, props, and costumes; advisor Rex Ellis even recommended the Gullah village as an appropriate place for Martin's family to hide. In addition, screenwriter Robert Rodat read through many journals and letters of colonists as part of his preparation for writing the screenplay.

Producer Mark Gordon said that in making the film, "while we were telling a fictional story, the backdrop was serious history". Some of the resulting characters and events thus were composites of real characters and events that were designed to serve the fictional narrative without losing the historical flavor. Rodat said of Gibson's character: "Benjamin Martin is a composite character made up of Thomas Sumter, Daniel Morgan, Andrew Pickens, and Francis Marion, and a few bits and pieces from a number of other characters." Rodat also indicated that the fictional Colonel William Tavington is "loosely based on Colonel Banastre Tarleton, who was particularly known for his brutal acts".

While some events, such as Tarleton's pursuit of Francis Marion and his fellow irregular soldiers who escaped by disappearing into the swamps of South Carolina, were loosely based on history, and others were adapted, such as the final battle in the film which combined elements of the Battles of Cowpens and Battle of Guilford Court House, most of the plot events in the film are pure fiction.

Criticism of Benjamin Martin as based on Francis Marion
The film was harshly criticized in the British press in part because of its connection to Francis Marion, a militia leader in South Carolina known as the "Swamp Fox".  After the release of The Patriot, the British newspaper The Guardian denounced Marion as "a serial rapist who hunted Red Indians for fun." Historian Christopher Hibbert said of Marion:

The truth is that people like Marion committed atrocities as bad, if not worse, than those perpetrated by the British.

The Patriot does not depict the American character Benjamin Martin as innocent of atrocities; a key plot point revolves around the character's guilt over acts he engaged in, such as torturing, killing, and mutilating prisoners during the French and Indian War, leading him to repentantly repudiate General Cornwallis for the brutality of his men.

Conservative radio host Michael Graham rejected Hibbert's criticism of Marion in a commentary published in National Review:

Was Francis Marion a slave owner? Was he a determined and dangerous warrior? Did he commit acts in an 18th century war that we would consider atrocious in the current world of peace and political correctness? As another great American film hero might say: 'You're damn right.'  "That's what made him a hero, 200 years ago and today."

Graham also refers to what he describes as "the unchallenged work of South Carolina's premier historian" Dr. Walter Edgar, who claimed in his 1998 South Carolina: A History that Marion's partisans were "a ragged band of both black and white volunteers".

Amy Crawford, in Smithsonian magazine, stated that modern historians such as William Gilmore Simms and Hugh Rankin have written accurate biographies of Marion, including Simms' The Life of Francis Marion.  The introduction to the 2007 edition of Simms' book was written by Sean Busick, a professor of American history at Athens State University in Alabama, who wrote:

Marion deserves to be remembered as one of the heroes of the War for Independence....Francis Marion was a man of his times: he owned slaves, and he fought in a brutal campaign against the Cherokee Indians...Marion's experience in the French and Indian War prepared him for more admirable service.

During pre-production, the producers debated on whether Martin would own slaves, ultimately deciding not to make him a slave owner. This decision received criticism from Spike Lee, who in a letter to The Hollywood Reporter accused the film's portrayal of slavery as being "a complete whitewashing of history". Lee wrote that after he and his wife went to see the film, "we both came out of the theatre fuming. For three hours The Patriot dodged around, skirted about or completely ignored slavery." Gibson himself remarked: "I think I would have made him a slave holder. Not to seems kind of a cop-out."

Criticism of Tavington as based on Tarleton
After release, several British voices criticized the film for its depiction of the film's villain Tavington and defended the historical character of Banastre Tarleton. Ben Fenton, commenting in the Daily Telegraph, wrote:

There is no evidence that Tarleton, called 'Bloody Ban' or 'The Butcher' in rebel pamphlets, ever broke the rules of war and certainly did not ever shoot a child in cold blood.

Although Tarleton gained the reputation among Americans as a butcher for his involvement in the Battle of Waxhaws in South Carolina, he was a hero in the City of Liverpool. Liverpool City Council, led by Mayor Edwin Clein, called for a public apology for what they viewed as the film's "character assassination" of Tarleton.

What happened during the Battle of The Waxhaws, known to the Americans as the Buford Massacre or as the Waxhaw massacre, is the subject of debate. According to an American field surgeon named Robert Brownfield who witnessed the events, the Continental Army Col. Buford raised a white flag of surrender, "expecting the usual treatment sanctioned by civilized warfare". While Buford was calling for quarter, Tarleton's horse was struck by a musket ball and fell. This gave the Loyalist cavalrymen the impression that the Continentals had shot at their commander while asking for mercy. Enraged, the Loyalist troops charged at the Virginians. According to Brownfield, the Loyalists attacked, carrying out "indiscriminate carnage never surpassed by the most ruthless atrocities of the most barbarous savages".

In Tarleton's own account, he stated that his horse had been shot from under him during the initial charge in which he was knocked out for several minutes and that his men, thinking him dead, engaged in "a vindictive asperity not easily restrained".

Tarleton's role in the Revolutionary War in the Carolinas is examined by Ben Rubin who shows that historically, while the actual events of the Battle of the Waxhaws were presented differently according to which side was recounting them, the story of Tarleton's atrocities at Waxhaws and on other occasions became a rallying cry, particularly at the Battle of King's Mountain. The tales of Tarleton's atrocities were a part of standard U.S. accounts of the war and were described by Washington Irving and by Christopher Ward in his 1952 history, The War of the Revolution, where Tarleton is described as "cold-hearted, vindictive, and utterly ruthless. He wrote his name in letters of blood all across the history of the war in the South." Not until Anthony Scotti's 2002 book, Brutal Virtue: The Myth and Reality of Banastre Tarleton, were Tarleton's actions fully reexamined. Scotti challenged the factual accounts of atrocities and stressed the "propaganda value that such stories held for the Americans both during and after the war". Scotti's book, however, did not come out until two years after The Patriot. Screenwriters consulting American works to build the character Tavington based on Tarleton would have commonly found descriptions of him as barbaric and accounts of his name being used for recruiting and motivation during the Revolutionary War itself.

Whereas Tavington is depicted as aristocratic but penniless, Tarleton came from a wealthy Liverpool merchant family. Tarleton did not die in battle or from impalement, as Tavington did in the film. Tarleton died on January 16, 1833, in Leintwardine, Herefordshire, England, at the age of 78, nearly 50 years after the war ended. He outlived Col. Francis Marion who died in 1795, by 38 years. Before his death,  Tarleton had achieved the military rank of General, equal to that held by the overall British Commanders during the American Revolution, and became a baronet and a member of the British Parliament.

Depiction of atrocities in the Revolutionary War
The Patriot was criticized for misrepresenting atrocities during the Revolutionary War, including the killing of prisoners of war and wounded soldiers and burning a church filled with townsfolk. While atrocities occurred during the war, the most striking of the film's depictions of British atrocities—the burning of a church full of unarmed colonial civilians—had virtually no factual basis nor parallel in the American or European 18th century wars, with the exception of the Massacre at Lucs-sur-Boulogne (fr) in 1794, which was a purely French affair with no connection to British troops nor the American Revolution. The New York Post film critic Jonathan Foreman was one of several focusing on this distortion in the film and wrote the following in an article at Salon.com:

The most disturbing thing about The Patriot is not just that German director Roland Emmerich (director of Independence Day) and his screenwriter Robert Rodat (who was criticized for excluding the roles played by British and other Allied troops in the Normandy landings from his script for Saving Private Ryan) depicted British troops as committing savage atrocities, but that those atrocities bear such a close resemblance to war crimes carried out by German troops—particularly the SS in World War II. It's hard not to wonder if the filmmakers have some kind of subconscious agenda... They have made a film that will have the effect of inoculating audiences against the unique historical horror of Oradour—and implicitly rehabilitating the Nazis while making the British seem as evil as history's worst monsters... So it's no wonder that the British press sees this film as a kind of blood libel against the British people.

The Washington Post film critic Stephen Hunter, a historian of the era, said: "Any image of the American Revolution which represents you Brits as Nazis and us as gentle folk is almost certainly wrong. It was a very bitter war, a total war, and that is something that I am afraid has been lost to history....[T]he presence of the Loyalists (colonists who did not want to join the fight for independence from Britain) meant that the War of Independence was a conflict of complex loyalties." The historian Richard F. Snow, editor of American Heritage magazine, said of the church-burning scene: "Of course it never happened—if it had do you think Americans would have forgotten it? It could have kept us out of World War I."

Home media 
The Patriot was released on DVD on October 24, 2000, a Blu-ray release followed on July 3, 2007. The Patriot was later released on 4K UHD Blu-ray on May 22, 2018.

See also
 List of films about the American Revolution
 List of television series and miniseries about the American Revolution

References

External links

 
 
 Government info on Southern Campaign, Banastre Tarleton, and Benjamin Martin

2000 drama films
2000 films
2000s action drama films
2000s historical action films
2000s war films
American action drama films
American war epic films
American films about revenge
American historical action films
American Revolutionary War films
American war drama films
Anti-British sentiment
Centropolis Entertainment films
Columbia Pictures films
Cultural depictions of George Washington
Epic films based on actual events
Films about Christianity
Films about prejudice
Films directed by Roland Emmerich
Films scored by John Williams
Films set in Charleston, South Carolina
Films set in South Carolina
Films set in 1776
Films set in the 1780s
Films set in Virginia
Films shot in South Carolina
Mutual Film Company films
War films based on actual events
Guerrilla warfare in film
2000s English-language films
2000s American films